Vicente Guerrero is a municipality in the Mexican state of Puebla. The capital of the commune is Santa María del Monte.

Geography
The commune had 20,391 inhabitants in 2005 (according to INEGI). From this total, 9,646 were men and 10,745 women. Its total area is 234.73 km2. 

The geographical coordinates of the commune are 18° 32′ N and 97° 12′ W. Its altitude is 2600 meters above the sea level.

Font: Statistics from INEGI.

External links
http://www.e-local.gob.mx/work/templates/enciclo/puebla/Mpios/21195a.htm 

Municipalities of Puebla